Kharms is a Russian-Lithuanian-Macedonian biographical film about the Russian poet Daniil Kharms directed by Ivan Bolotnikov. Its planned release date was 2 November 2017. It received the awards for Best Cinematography and Best Screenplay at the Shanghai International Film Festival in 2017.

Plot
In the center of the story is the elegant writer Daniil Yuvachev, who continues to call himself the genius Kharms, despite the fact that his works still have not been published. He is poor and is not understood by women with whom he communicates. He feels at home at various literary events at which he is constantly present. The film tells about his battle with himself, with his shortcomings, desires and the whole world which is pressing upon him.

Cast
 Wojciech Urbanski as Kharms
 Aleksandr Bashirov as Kharms' neighbour / old woman who fell from the window
 Grigoriy Chaban as Alexander Vvedensky
 Aiste Dirziute as Marina Malich
 Andrey Feskov as Leonid Lipavsky
 Darius Gumauskas as Yakov Druskin
 Nikita Kukushkin as nephew Sno
 Artyom Semakin as Nikolay Zabolotsky

References

External links 

2017 biographical drama films
Russian biographical drama films
Biographical films about writers
Biographical films about poets
Films set in Russia
Films shot in Russia
Films set in the 1920s
Films set in the 1930s
Cultural depictions of Russian men
Cultural depictions of writers
Cultural depictions of poets
2017 drama films
2010s Russian-language films